Frankism was a heretical Sabbatean Jewish religious movement of the 18th and 19th centuries, centered on the leadership of the Jewish Messiah claimant Jacob Frank, who lived from 1726 to 1791. Frank rejected religious norms and said that his followers were obligated to transgress as many moral boundaries as possible. At its height it claimed perhaps 50,000 followers, primarily Jews living in Poland, as well as in Central and Eastern Europe.

Description  
Unlike traditional Judaism, which provides a set of detailed social, cultural, and religious norms and laws (halakha) that regulate many aspects of life of observant Jews, Frank claimed that "all laws and teachings will fall" and, following antinomianism, asserted that the most important obligation of every person was the transgression of every boundary.

Frankism is associated with the Sabbateans of Turkey, a religious movement that identified the 17th-century Jewish rabbi Sabbatai Zevi as the Messiah. Like Frankism, the earlier forms of Sabbateanism believed that at least in some circumstances, antinomianism was the correct path. Zevi himself would perform actions that violated traditional Jewish taboos, such as eating foods that were forbidden by kashrut, the Jewish dietary laws, and celebrating prescribed fast days as feast days. Especially after Zevi's death, a number of branches of Sabbateanism evolved that disagreed among themselves over which aspects of traditional Judaism should be preserved and which should be discarded. In Frankism, orgies featured prominently in ritual. 

According to Gershom Scholem, a 20th century authority on Sabbateanism and Kabbalah, Kraushar had described Frank's sayings as "grotesque, comical and incomprehensible." In his classic essay "Redemption Through Sin," Scholem argued a different position which placed Frankism as a later and more radical outgrowth of Sabbateanism. In contrast, Jay Michaelson argues that Frankism was "an original theology that was innovative, if sinister" that was, in many respects, a departure from the earlier formulations of Sabbateanism. In traditional Sabbatean doctrine, Zevi (and often his followers) claimed to be able to liberate the sparks of holiness hidden within what seemed to be evil. According to Michaelson, Frank's theology asserted that the attempt to liberate the sparks of holiness was the problem, not the solution. Rather, Frank claimed that the "mixing" between holy and unholy was virtuous. Netanel Lederberg claims that Frank had a Gnostic philosophy wherein there was a "true God" whose existence was hidden by a "false God." This "true God" could allegedly be revealed only through a total destruction of the social and religious structures created by the "false God," thus leading to a thorough antinomianism. For Frank, the very distinction between good and evil is a product of a world governed by the "false God." Lederberg compares Frank's position to that of Friedrich Nietzsche.

After Jacob Frank 
After Jacob Frank's death in 1791, his daughter Eve, who had been declared in 1770 to be the incarnation of the Shekhinah, the dwelling of the divine presence, continued to lead the movement with her brothers.

See also 
 Khlysts

References

Bibliography 
 
 
 
 
 Maciejko, Pawel (2005). "'Baruch Yavan and the Frankist movement : intercession in an age of upheaval", Jahrbuch des Simon-Dubnow-Instituts 4 (2005) pp. 333–354.
 Maciejko, Pawel (2006). "'Christian elements in early Frankist doctrine", Gal-Ed 20 (2006) pp. 13–41.
 
 
 
 Emeliantseva, Ekaterina, "Zwischen jüdischer Tradition und frankistischer Mystik. Zur Geschichte der Prager Frankistenfamilie Wehle: 1760–1800," Jewish History Quarterly/Kwartalnik Historii Żydów 4 (2001), pp. 549–565.
 Emeliantseva Koller, Ekaterina, "Der fremde Nachbar: Warschauer Frankisten in der Pamphletliteratur des Vierjährigen Sejms: 1788–1792," in: A. Binnenkade, E. Emeliantseva, S. Pacholkiv (eds.), Vertraut und fremd zugleich. Jüdisch-christliche Nachbarschaften in Warschau – Lengnau – Lemberg (= Jüdische Moderne 8), Köln-Weimar: Böhlau 2009, pp. 21–94.
 Emeliantseva Koller, Ekaterina, "Situative Religiosität – situative Identität: Neue Zugänge zur Geschichte des Frankismus in Prag (1750–1860)," in: P. Ernst, G. Lamprecht (eds.), Konzeptionen des Jüdischen – Kollektive Entwürfe im Wandel (= Schriften des Centrums für Jüdische Studien 11), Innsbruck 2009, pp. 38–62.

External links 
 The Collection of the Words of the Lord, by Jacob Frank, translated and edited by Harris Lenowitz